Peter Theobaldus Curtenius (April 3, 1734 in New York City – 1798 in New York City) was an American merchant and politician.

Early life
Peter Theobaldus Curtenius was born on April 3, 1734 in New York City. He was the son of Rev. Anthonius Curtenius, a clergyman of the Dutch Church who had come from Holland to the United States.

Career
In 1774, he was a member of the New York Committee of Correspondence. On May 31, 1775, the New York Provincial Congress appointed him Commissary General, with the rank of colonel, being in charge of the purchase of provisions for the Continental Army.

In 1782, after the resignation of merchant and banker Comfort Sands, he was appointed New York State Auditor, holding the post until the creation of the succeeding office of comptroller in 1797.

Personal life
In August 1755, he married Catharine Goelet (died 1806), a sister of his partner Peter Goelet, and their children were:

 Elizabeth Curtenius (born 1757)
 Anthony Curtenius (born 1759)
 Catharine Curtenius Dunlap (born 1761)
 Gen. Peter Curtenius (1763–1817), who married Mary Anna Lasher (d. 1829)
 Janet Curtenius (born 1765)
 Philip Curtenius (born 1768)
 Jane Curtenius (1770–1846), who married Elbert Roosevelt (1767–1857), a grandson of Johannes Roosevelt.
 Mary Curtenius (born 1773)
 Anthony Washington Curtenius (born 1775).

He died from yellow fever in New York City, and was originally buried at the vault of the Middle Dutch Church on Cedar Street, but he and his son Peter's remains were re-interred in 1857 at the Beechwoods Cemetery in New Rochelle, New York.

Descendants
His son Peter as the Marshal of the City of New York in 1812 carried out a registration of "Alien Enemies", that is British people, of whom there were about 1500 in the city, following the outbreak of the War of 1812. His grandson, Clinton Roosevelt (1804–1898), was a politician and inventor.

Sources

External links
 

1734 births
1798 deaths
Goelet family
New York State Comptrollers
Politicians from New York City
Deaths from yellow fever
American people of Dutch descent
Infectious disease deaths in New York (state)